Bevy may refer to:

 A large group or collection of something
 Collonges-lès-Bévy, a commune in the Côte-d'Or department in eastern France
 Bévy, a commune in the Côte-d'Or department in eastern France
 Scots for an alcoholic beverage
 A group of otters
 A flock of quail

See also
 Bevier (disambiguation)

es:Bevy